A Gershwin Fantasia is a single by jazz pianist Mike Garson, and was released in 1992. The lone track, "A Gershwin Fantasia" is a medley of tracks by George Gershwin, given an avant-garde treatment by Garson. In 2008 the track was combined with the Oxnard Sessions, Vol.2 and re-released as the album 'Jazzhat' by Allegro Records.

Track listing

External links
 Jazz Hat review. Review of re-packaged version of album.
 Amazon Review. Amazon album review and track listing.
 mikegarson.com. Preview of Album at Mikegarson.com.

Mike Garson albums
1992 albums